Thaqban is a village in Bani al-Harith District of Amanat al-Asimah Governorate, Yemen. It is located just south of the point where the Wadi Zahr opens out onto the Sanaa plain. It is part of the 'uzlah of Qaryat al-Qabil.

Name and history 
The 10th-century writer al-Hamdani related a legend about the village of Thaqban in his Iklil and wrote that Thaqban takes its name from one Thaqban b. Nawf b. Sharaḥbīl, of the tribe of Himyar.

References 

Villages in Sanaa Governorate